Truls Engen Korsæth (born 16 September 1993) is a Norwegian former cyclist, who competed for the Lillehammer CK,  and  teams between 2012 and 2018. During the 2018 season he suffered from illness, with his last race of the year being the Tour de Yorkshire in May, and in September 2018 he announced his retirement from competition.

Major results

2011
 2nd Time trial, National Junior Road Championships
2012
 1st  Time trial, National Under-23 Road Championships
2013
 1st  Time trial, National Under-23 Road Championships
 1st Stage 3 (TTT) Circuit des Ardennes
2014
 1st Duo Normand (with Reidar Borgersen)
2015
 National Road Championships
1st  Under-23 time trial
2nd Under-23 road race
3rd Time trial
 2nd Ronde van Noord-Holland
 3rd Ronde van Vlaanderen Beloften
 4th Time trial, UCI Under-23 Road World Championships
 9th Overall ZLM Tour
2016
 1st Stage 1 Tour de Gironde
 6th Duo Normand (with Reidar Borgersen)
 8th Chrono des Nations
 9th Chrono Champenois

References

External links

1993 births
Living people
Sportspeople from Lillehammer
Norwegian male cyclists